John Paul Stevens High School is one of nineteen public high schools in the Northside Independent School District in San Antonio, Texas, USA. The campus is located near SeaWorld San Antonio. As with all Northside ISD schools, the school is named for a United States Supreme Court justice, in this case John Paul Stevens, who attended the school's dedication in 2005. In 2017, the school was rated "Met Standard" by the Texas Education Agency.

As of Fall 2017, the enrollment at Stevens is capped at 3,000, and middle schools that would normally feed into Stevens now feed into Earl Warren High School and William Howard Taft High School (areas outside of Loop 1604 off Potranco and Military Roads).

History
In 1987, Pope John Paul II held mass on the site that later became Stevens High School. The service was part of his visit to San Antonio, and a monument sits near the school to commemorate the visit.

Stevens was built with funds from the voter approved 2001 Bond Issue. Designed by PBK Architects, it was built by Bartlett Cocke Contractors at a cost of $50 million. The , state of the art school building is two-story, and has an abundance of natural light.

Athletics
The Stevens Falcons compete in the following sports:

Baseball
Basketball
Cross Country
Football
Golf
Soccer
Softball
Swimming & Diving
Tennis
Track
Volleyball

Notable alumni
Rynell Parson (Class of 2009) — Track and field athlete specializing in the 100 meters dash
Marcus Davenport (Class of 2014) — Professional American football player for the New Orleans Saints

References

External links
John Paul Stevens High School
Northside Independent School District
PBK Architects

Educational institutions established in 2005
High schools in San Antonio
Public high schools in Bexar County, Texas
Northside Independent School District high schools
2005 establishments in Texas